The 2017 Royal Bernard Drome Classic was the 4th edition of the La Drôme Classic road cycling one day race. It was held on 26 February 2017 as part of UCI Europe Tour in category 1.1.

Teams
Seventeen teams of up to eight riders started the race:

General classification

References

External links 
 

2017 UCI Europe Tour
2017 in French sport
La Drôme Classic